The 2012 Los Angeles Blues season was the club's second year of existence, their second year in USL Pro, the third division of the American soccer pyramid.

Background 

After a 7th overall finish in 2011 and an exit in the first round of the Playoffs, the Blues retained few players from 2011 onto the 2012. Coach Naimo retained only Carlos Borja, Israel Sesay, Erlys Garcia and Amir Abedzadeh.

The Blues also announced the hiring of Steve Donner (formerly CEO of Orlando City) as vice president of business operations to focus on better marketing of the club and to bring professionalism to the front-office. The first game of the 2012 season reflected these efforts with a 2,432 attendance compared to 696 for the first home game in 2011 (the Blues averaged 382 during the 2011 season).

Competitions

Preseason

USL Pro regular season

Standings

U.S. Open Cup

See also 
 2012 in American soccer

References 

2012 USL Pro season
Orange County SC seasons
American soccer clubs 2012 season
2012 in sports in California